This is a list of the Austrian number-one singles of 2008.

References

Number-one hits
Austria
2008